The following is a list of the Seljuk Sultans of Rum, from 1077 to 1307.  The sultans of Rûm were descended from Arslan Isra'il, son of the warlord Seljuk.  The Seljuk empire was founded by Chaghri and Tughril, sons of Arslan's brother Mikail ibn Seljuk.

 Qutalmish, son of Arslan Isra'il, 1060–1077
 Suleiman I, son of Qutalmish, 1077–1086
 Abu'l Qasim (self-declared, Nicaea), appointed by Suleiman ibn Kutalmish, 1084
Kilij Arslan I, son of Suleiman ibn Kutalmish, 1092–1109
 Malik Shah, son of Kilij Arslan, 1109–1116
Mesud I, son of Kilij Arslan, 1116–1156
Kilij Arslan II, son of Mesud I, 1156–1192
Kaykhusraw I, son of Kilij Arslan II, 1192–1197
 Suleiman II, son of Kilij Arslan II, 1197–1204
 Kilij Arslan III, son of Suleiman II, 1204–1205
Kaykhusraw I (second rule), 1205–1211
Kaykaus I, son of Kaykhusraw I, 1211–1220
Kayqubad I, son of Kaykhusraw I, 1220–1237
Kaykhusraw II, son of Kayqubad I, 1237–1246
Kaykaus II, son of Kaykhusraw II (sole rule) 1246–1248
Kaykaus II (joint rule), 1246–1259 (with Kilij Arslan IV, 1248-1259, with Kayqubad II, 1249-1257)
Kilij Arslan IV, son of Kaykhusraw II (joint rule), 1248–1265 (with Kaykaus II, 1246-1259, with Kayqubad II, 1249-1257)
Kayqubad II, son of Kaykhusraw II (joint rule), 1249–1257 (with Kaykaus II and Kilij Arslan IV)
Kilij Arslan IV (sole rule), 1259–1265
Kaykhusraw III, son of Kilij Arslan IV, 1265–1282
Mesud II, son of Kaykaus II, 1282–1284
Kayqubad III, son of Faramurz (son of Kaykaus II), 1284
Mesud II (second rule), 1284–1293
Kayqubad III (second rule), 1293–1294
Mesud II (third rule), 1294–1301
Kayqubad III (third rule), 1301–1303
Mesud II (fourth rule), 1303–1307

Taken over by the Mongols, 1307.

References

1. Bosworth, Clifford E., The New Islamic Dynasties:  A Chronological and Genealogical Manual, Columbia University Press, New York, 1996, pp. 213-214

2.  Baldwin, Marshall W., and Setton, Kenneth M, A History of the Crusades: Volume One, The First Hundred Years, The University of Wisconsin Press, Madison, 1969, pg. 701 (index list of Selchükids of Rûm through Kilij Arslan II)

3.  Wolff, Robert L. and Hazard, H. W., A History of the Crusades: Volume Two, The Later Crusades 1187-1311, The University of Wisconsin Press, Madison, 1977, pg. 862 (index list of Selchükids of Rûm after Kilij Arslan II)

4.   Murray, Alan V. The Crusades—An Encyclopedia, ABC-CLIO, Santa Barbara, 2006, pp. 1050-1052.

See also
Seljuk dynasty

Rum